María Dávila Guerra (born 1990) is a contemporary Spanish painter. She was born in Málaga, and lives and works in Granada.

Biography
María Dávila holds a Bachelor of Fine Arts from the University of Málaga and a PhD in History and Arts from the University of Granada.

While still a student, she started to have solo exhibitions and to participate in group shows in major art centers in Andalusia. In 2014, she won the MálagaCrea 2014 First prize and was preselected two years consecutively to the BMW paintings Awards in 2015 and 2016.

Work
Her painting deals with the limits of the visible and the boundaries between fiction and reality. Based on a photographic or cinematographic material (family archives, still from movies or documentary films), María Dávila explores, more specifically, some aspects of her main theme in different series:
 "Anagnórisis – La trama" (2014) seeks to highlight the underlying similitudes between fiction and documentary films, with an emphasis on the interpretive nature of our relationship to reality.  
 "Solsticio" (2015) deals with our inability to recognize our image and the non-correspondence between memory and lived experience. The series is based on an album of family photographs.
 "Dramatis personae" (2015) is about the act of looking and being looked at through a dialogue with cinematographic form based on narrative (de)construction such as Surrealist or Nouvelle Vague films.
"Post scriptum" is focused on the narrative construction in personal relationships, through a dialogue with cinema and theater.

Solo exhibitions
 2013: Después, el silencio, Centro Cultural Provincial, Málaga
 2014: Anagnórisis - La trama, School of Fine Arts, Málaga 
 2015: Dramatis personae, El Palmeral de las Sorpresas/Espacio Iniciarte, Málaga
 2017-2018: Post scriptum, Palacio de los Condes de Gabia, Granada

Group exhibitions (selection)
 2012: Stand Byes. End of studies Art Project Málaga 2012, Centro Cultural Provincial, Málaga
 2014: MálagaCrea 2014. Muestra de Artes Visuales, Centro de Arte Contemporáneo de Málaga (CAC Málaga); UNDER35. Arte Emergente en Málaga, Galería de Arte Contemporáneo (GACMA), Málaga  
 2015: 30th edition of BMW Painting Awards, Casa de Vacas del Retiro, Madrid; Neighbours III. Artistas de proximidad, Centro de Arte Contemporáneo de Málaga (CAC Málaga); Okupart. MAUS Málaga, Málaga city hall/CAC Málaga; Imago Mundi: Made in Spain, Foundation Luciano Benetton/Centro de Arte Contemporáneo de Málaga (CAC Málaga)
 2016: Tiempo de luz, Museo del Patrimonio Municipal (MUPAM), Málaga; 31st edition of BMW Painting Awards, Centro Galileo, Madrid

Awards (selection)
 2012: First prize, VI Painting Prize of the University of Málaga
 2013: Extraordinary Award, School of Fine Arts/University of Málaga
 2014: First Prize, MálagaCrea 2014
 2015: Preselected for BMW Painting Award
 2016: Preselected for BMW Painting Award

Bibliography
 María Dávila – Después, el silencio, text by Marina Bravo Casero, Council of Málaga/Department of Culture, 2013. 
 María Dávila – Anagnórisis-La trama, text by Pedro Osakar Olaiz, School of Fine Arts, Málaga, 2014. 
 María Dávila – Dramatis personae, text by Víctor Borrego, Government of Andalusia/Department of Culture, 2015. 
 María Dávila - Post scriptum, texts by Luis Puelles and María Dávila, City of Granada/Department of Culture, 2017.

References

External links
 
 Jean-Marie Oger

1990 births
Living people
21st-century Spanish women artists
21st-century Spanish painters
Contemporary painters
Spanish contemporary artists
Spanish women painters
People from Málaga
University of Málaga alumni